Geoffrey Demeyere (born 31 October 1976 in Roeselare) is a Belgian former road cyclist, who competed as a professional from 2000 to 2004.

Major results

1998
 2nd Overall Triptyque des Monts et Châteaux
 2nd Paris–Roubaix Espoirs
 3rd Grand Prix de Waregem
1999
 1st Overall 
1st Stage 2
 3rd 
2001
 5th Grand Prix d'Isbergues
2002
 1st Stage 2 Circuito Montañes
 2nd Druivenkoers-Overijse
2003
 7th Rund um die Hainleite-Erfurt
 10th Overall Deutschland Tour
2004
 1st Schaal Sels
 2nd Druivenkoers-Overijse
2005
 2nd Overall 
1st Stage 3
2006
 1st 
 1st Stage 3 Tour de Liège
2007
 3rd Overall 
2008
 3rd

References

External links

Belgian male cyclists
1976 births
Living people
People from Roeselare
Cyclists from West Flanders